Newtonairds (NX877801) was one of the principal stations on the now closed Cairn Valley Light Railway branch from Dumfries.  It served a very rural area in Dumfries and Galloway.

History 
The CVR was nominally independent, but was in reality controlled by the Glasgow and South Western Railway. The line was closed to passengers on 3 May 1943, during WW2 and to freight on 4 July 1949, and the track lifted in 1953.

The station cost £212 to build in red brick with cream painted poster boards and chocolate-coloured framing. The extension over the front was covered with red tiles, as was the main roof. A booking office and waiting room was provided.  A station master's house was provided.

The passing loop and signal box at Newtonairds remained even after the 'one engine in steam' method of working was introduced circa 1936.

Trains were controlled by a 'lock and block' system whereby the trains operated treadles on the single line to interact with the block instruments.

See also 

 List of closed railway stations in Britain

References 
Notes

Sources
 
 Kirkpatrick, Ian (2000). The Cairn Valley Light Railway. Usk : The Oakwood Press. .
 Sanders, Keith and Hodgins, Douglas (1995). British Railways. Past and Present South West Scotland. No. 19. .
 Thomas, David St John & Whitehouse, Patrick (1993). The Romance of Scotlands Railways. Newton Abbot : David St John Thomas. .

Disused railway stations in Dumfries and Galloway
Former Glasgow and South Western Railway stations
Railway stations in Great Britain opened in 1905
Railway stations in Great Britain closed in 1943